James Hastie may refer to:

 James Hastie (rower) (1848–1897), British rower
 James Hastie (footballer) (1892–1914), Scottish footballer

See also
 Jim Hastie (1920–1996), Scottish cricketer
 Jim Hastie (footballer) (born 1949), Scottish footballer